The 2013–14 Lietuvos krepšinio lyga was the 21st season of the top-tier level professional basketball league of Lithuania, the Lietuvos krepšinio lyga (LKL).

Competition format

Regular season 
During the regular season, which lasted from 26 September, until 27 April, all teams except Žalgiris, Lietuvos rytas and Neptūnas played 34 games (four against each other, and two against the three mentioned teams). The three mentioned teams only played twenty games, two against each team.

Playoff round 
The top eight teams in the regular season round were divided up into pairs, and each pair played two games (a third game was played if each team in the pair won a game). The semifinals were also played in that format. The playoff round lasted from 28 April until 20 May.

The final round was played between the two winners of the semifinals. The final series for the first place were played in a best-of-seven format, while the series for the third place were played in a best-of-five format.

Regular season

Standings

Notable Matches

Playoffs

Bracket
{{8TeamBracket-with third

| RD1         = Quarterfinals
| RD2         = Semifinals
| RD3         = finals''

| group1      =
| group2      =

| seed-width  = 30
| team-width  = 150
| 

| RD1-seed1   = 1
| RD1-team1   = Lietuvos rytas| RD1-score1  = 2| RD1-seed2   = 8
| RD1-team2   = Nevėžis
| RD1-score2  = 0

| RD1-seed3   = 4
| RD1-team3   = Žalgiris| RD1-score3  = 2| RD1-seed4   = 5
| RD1-team4  = Pieno žvaigždės
| RD1-score4  = 0

| RD1-seed5   = 2
| RD1-team5   = TonyBet| RD1-score5  = 2| RD1-seed6   = 7
| RD1-team6   = Juventus
| RD1-score6  = 0

| RD1-seed7   = 3 
| RD1-team7   = Neptūnas| RD1-score7  = 2| RD1-seed8   = 6
| RD1-team8   = Šiauliai
| RD1-score8  = 1

| RD2-seed1   = 1
| RD2-team1   = Lietuvos rytas
| RD2-score1  = 1
| RD2-seed2   = 4
| RD2-team2   = Žalgiris| RD2-score2  = 2| RD2-seed3   = 2
| RD2-team3   = TonyBet
| RD2-score3  = 0
| RD2-seed4   = 3
| RD2-team4   = Neptūnas| RD2-score4  = 2| RD3-seed1   = 4
| RD3-team1   = Žalgiris| RD3-score1  = 4| RD3-seed2   = 3
| RD3-team2   = Neptūnas
| RD3-score2  = 2

| RD3-seed3= 1
| RD3-team3= Lietuvos rytas| RD3-score3=3| RD3-seed4= 2
| RD3-team4= TonyBet
| RD3-score4=0
}}

 Statistics PointsReboundsAssists'''

Updated: 26 May 2014

References

External links
 LKL website

 
Lietuvos krepšinio lyga seasons
Lithuanian
LKL